The Mark Williams Company was a small software company in Chicago, Illinois (later moved to Northbrook) that created Coherent, one of the first Unix-like operating systems for IBM PCs and several C programming language compilers. It was founded by Robert Swartz in 1977 and discontinued operations in 1995. The name comes from the middle name of Robert Swartz's father, William Mark Swartz.

Robert Swartz moved the company (originally producing a soft drink called Dr. Enuf) into software with his father's help and the company became known as the Mark Williams Company.

Mark Williams won a patent lawsuit centered on 'byte ordering'. Separately and at that time, Linux had made serious inroads in the UNIX clone market. Since Coherent was a commercially available package and Linux was distributed freely on the Internet via their GNU public license, Coherent sales plummeted and Swartz had no choice but to cease operations in 1995.

Products
 Produced Coherent, a clone of Unix.
 csd, C source debugger.
 Let's C, low-cost professional C compiler for the IBM PC.
 Mark Williams C for CP/M-86.
 Mark Williams C for the Atari ST, first major C programming environment for the ST computers.
 XYBasic, a process control BASIC running on CP/M that could be burned on to memory (EPROM) and run on an 8080 standalone processor.

References

External links 
START Vol. 1 No. 3 Mark Williams C & Menu by Arick Anders
START Vol. 2 No. 2 Mark Williams C 2.0 by Arick Anderson
Mark Williams Company documentation

Defunct software companies of the United States
Software companies established in 1980
American companies disestablished in 1995
Unix history
American companies established in 1980